Waltons Stores (Interstate) Ltd v Maher, is a leading case in Australian contract law. The Australian High Court decided that estoppel, in certain circumstances could be a cause of action.

Facts
Maher owned some property with buildings on it in Nowra. He was negotiating with a department store company called Waltons Stores (at the time controlled by the Bond Corporation) for a lease of the land. They wanted an existing building to be demolished and a new one erected.

In reliance on representations made before a contract was completed, Maher demolished the building and started to erect a new one. But the contract never came to completion because Waltons Stores did not sign the lease as Maher had yelled at them and become hostile towards them. Waltons told their solicitors to slow the deal while they did further investigations as to whether the transaction would be good business, but allowed Maher to remain under the impression that the deal would be completed.

Judgment
The High Court held that to avoid detriment through Waltons' unconscionable behaviour, Waltons was estopped from denying the contract. Whilst the mere exercise of legal right not to exchange contracts was not unconscionable, there were two additional elements which made Waltons' conduct unconscionable: a) element of  urgency, b) Maher executed and forwarded on 11/11 and assumed execution by Walton was a formality. The award (though very similar to an expectation interest, as if it were a contract that was enforced) was only meant to cover reliance. Because Maher had acted to his detriment, in reliance on the encouragement of Walton Stores, which had acted unconscionably, equity would intervene.

Brennan J said the following

Brennan J, Deane J and Gaudron J gave concurring judgments.

See also
Combe v Combe [1951] 2 KB 215
Crabb v Arun DC [1976] Ch 176
Williams v Roffey Bros Ltd
Baird Textile Holdings Ltd v Marks & Spencer plc [2001] EWCA Civ 274
Promissory estoppel

References

Contract case law
High Court of Australia cases
1988 in case law
1988 in Australian law